Playita del Condado is a beach located at the end of Ashford Avenue in Condado, Puerto Rico.

Playita del Condado 
Playita del Condado is a beach near Condado Lagoon. It is near Miramar and Isla Grande Boulevard and a seven-minute drive from Old San Juan.

In 2014, an open-air gym at Playita del Condado was inaugurated.

References

Beaches of Puerto Rico
Condado (Santurce)
Geography of San Juan, Puerto Rico
Tourist attractions in San Juan, Puerto Rico